Interstate 190 may refer to the following Interstate Highways in the United States related to Interstate 90:
Interstate 190 (Illinois), a spur into Chicago's O'Hare International Airport
Interstate 190 (Massachusetts), a spur from Worcester to Leominster
Interstate 190 (New York), a spur into Buffalo and Niagara Falls
Interstate 190 (South Dakota), a spur into downtown Rapid City

90-1
1